Lars-Henrik Undeland (born 5 July 1954) is a Swedish orienteering competitor. He received a silver medal in the relay event at the 1981 World Orienteering Championships in Thun, together with Bengt Levin, Jörgen Mårtensson and Lars Lönnkvist, and placed 12th in the individual event. He placed first in the 5-days event O-Ringen in 1979.

References

1954 births
Living people
Swedish orienteers
Male orienteers
Foot orienteers
World Orienteering Championships medalists